The second season of the reality television series Love & Hip Hop: Hollywood aired on VH1 from September 7, 2015 until December 7, 2015. It was primarily filmed in Los Angeles, California. It is executively produced by Mona Scott-Young and Stephanie Gayle for Monami Entertainment, Toby Barraud, Stefan Springman, Mala Chapple, David DiGangi and Michael Lang for Eastern TV, and Susan Levison, Nina L. Diaz, Vivian Gomez and Ken Martinez for VH1.

The series chronicles the lives of several women and men in the Hollywood area, involved in hip hop music. It consisted of 14 episodes, including a two-part reunion special hosted by Nina Parker.

Production
On August 10, 2015, VH1 announced that Love & Hip Hop: Hollywood would be returning for a second season on September 7, 2015. All main cast members from the previous season returned. Ray J's girlfriend Princess Love joined the supporting cast, along with long time Love & Hip Hop: New York cast member Rich Dollaz, aspiring rappers Miles Brock and Milan Christopher, Miles' ex-girlfriend Amber Laura, Ray J's best friend Brandi Boyd, her husband Max Lux, Willie Taylor and his wife Shanda Denyce. Soulja's fling Nastassia Smith, Fizz's girlfriend Kamiah Adams, gossip blogger Jason Lee and Moniece's mother Marla Thomas would appear in minor supporting roles. On August 8, 2015, a Meet the Cast promo video was released, featuring returning cast members Ray, Moniece, Teairra and Princess, alongside new cast members Amber, Miles, Willie, Milan and Brandi. A 5-minute long "super-trailer" was released on August 27, 2015. 

Miles and Milan were the first openly gay couple of the franchise and several episodes featured public service announcements aimed to help viewers struggling with their sexual identity. On October 12, 2015, VH1 announced that Love & Hip Hop: Out in Hip Hop, a round-table discussion moderated by T. J. Holmes of ABC News, would air on October 19, 2015. The special focused on the reality on being openly LGBT in the hip hop community, and coincided with the airing of the seventh episode "Truth", in which bisexual cast member Miles comes out to his ex-girlfriend Amber. 

On September 16, 2015, during filming, Hazel-E announced on social media that she had quit the series, comparing it to a "freak show". Hazel had become increasingly frustrated that she had not been properly credited for her work behind-the-scenes, including her influence on casting, as well as her idea for the show title Love & Hip Hop: Hollywood instead of the original Love & Hip Hop: L.A..  Apryl and Omarion did not attend the taping of the second season reunion as Omarion was on tour. On December 7, 2015, Apryl confirmed the two had quit the show and would not be returning next season.

Reception
The series premiere garnered big ratings for the network, with VH1 announcing a combined rating of 3.6 million viewers. The show's gay storyline received significant media attention, with the special Out in Hip Hop garnering 1.5 million viewers, ranking #1 among women 18-49 in its time period.

Cast

Starring

 Teairra Marí (13 episodes)
 Moniece Slaughter (12 episodes)
 Apryl Jones (10 episodes)
 Hazel-E (10 episodes)
 Ray J (12 episodes)
 Lil' Fizz (10 episodes)
 Omarion (8 episodes)
 Soulja Boy (7 episodes)

Also starring

 Milan Christopher (13 episodes)
 Princess Love (11 episodes)
 Nikki Mudarris (13 episodes)
 Rich Dollaz (9 episodes)
 Amber Laura (12 episodes)
 Miles Brock (14 episodes)
 Nia Riley (9 episodes)
 Brandi Boyd (10 episodes)
 Nastassia Smith (5 episodes)
 Kamiah Adams (5 episodes)
 Max Lux (8 episodes)
 Jason Lee (3 episodes)
 Marla Thomas (5 episodes)
 Shanda Denyce (11 episodes)
 Willie Taylor (9 episodes)

Amber's sister Angel Hunter-Brignac and Miles' sister Charmagne Gibson appear as guest stars in several episodes. The show also features minor appearances from notable figures within the hip hop industry and Hollywood's social scene, including Lil Wayne, R. Malcolm Jones, Ray's manager Cash "Wack 100" Jones, Willie's manager Screwface, Miles' psychotherapist Dr. Stacy Kaiser, Tiny, Nick Cannon, Teddy Riley, Moniece's cousin Stevie Mackey, Big Boy and Nikki's mother Michelle Mudarris.

Episodes

Music
Several cast members had their music featured on the show and released singles to coincide with the airing of the episodes.

References

External links

2015 American television seasons
Love & Hip Hop